Epoxy putty refers to a group of room-temperature-hardening substances used as space-filling adhesives. Exact compositions vary according to manufacturer and application. They are stored until used as two components of clay-like consistency. Kneading the two components into each other creates an exothermic chemical reaction that activates the substance for use by catalyzing an epoxide polymerisation reaction.  Unlike many other types of glues, an epoxy adhesive can fill gaps and even be molded into a structural part. Some makers claim in advertising that one can drill and tap their cured products and that they quickly cure "hard as steel" (as measured by Shore rating), though they are much weaker than steel in tensile strength and shear strength.

Epoxy putty is often used by miniature modelers and sculptors. Modelers use it to join disparate parts into a whole with the joins covered by molded putty, often shaped into protrusions or textures to match their surroundings. The most common variety of epoxy putty used in modeling has its component clays colored yellow and blue, respectively, and the mixed, hardened end product is green. This has given rise to the colloquial name green stuff for epoxy putty.

See also 
 Putty
 Milliput
 Pratley Putty

External links 
 Megastick Epoxy Putty
 How to Glue Styrofoam to Various Surfaces

Adhesives

it:Colla epossidica